Crassispira grignonensis is an extinct species of sea snail, a marine gastropod mollusk in the family Pseudomelatomidae, the turrids and allies.

Distribution
Fossils have been found in Eocene strata in the Ile-de-France, France.

References

 Brébion (P.), 1992 - Quelques Cônes et Pleurotomes du Lutétien du Bassin de Paris. Cossmanniana, hors série, vol. 1, p. 1-25

External links
 Pacaud J.M. & Le Renard J. (1995). Révision des Mollusques paléogènes du Bassin de Paris. IV- Liste systématique actualisée. Cossmanniana. 3(4): 151-187

grignonensis
Gastropods described in 1889